The Verona Sacramentary or Leonine Sacramentary (Sacramentarium Leonianum) is the oldest surviving liturgical book of the Roman rite. It is not a sacramentary in the strict sense, but rather a private collection of libelli missarum (missal booklets) containing only the prayers for certain Masses and not the scriptures, the canon or the antiphons. It is named after the sole surviving manuscript, Codex Veronensis LXXXV, which was found in the chapter library of the cathedral of Verona by Giuseppe Bianchini and published in his four-volume Anastasii bibliothecarii vitae Romanorum pontificum in 1735. It is sometimes called "Leonine" because it has been attributed to Pope Leo I (died 461), but while some of the prayers may be his compositions the entire work certainly is not.

The Codex Veronensis LXXXV was copied in the early seventh century outside of Rome, but some of its material is clearly derived from Roman pamphlets (libelli missarum) and dates to the fifth and sixth centuries. Its contents are arranged according to the civil calendar, but the three quires containing the period 1 January – 14 April are lost. Thus, there is no information in the earliest Roman liturgical book concerning the Easter Vigil.

References

Further reading

 Facsimile: Sacramentarium Leonianum: Akademische Druck- u. Verlagsanstalt (ADEVA), Graz 1960. Complete edition for studies of the liturgical manuscript from the Chapter Library in Verona. Reproduction in original size 175 x 240 mm. Size of the facsimile edition including margin 230 x 330 mm. Binding: half leather. Introduction (german): F. Sauer, Graz. 286 pp; CODICES SELECTI, Vol. I

Catholic liturgical books